Roll No 21 (also known as Krish) is an Indian animated television series produced by Cosmos Entertainment. The show is available in  English, Hindi, Telugu and Tamil. It premiered on 27 November 2010 as one of the first Indian originals of Cartoon Network.

Plot 
Krish (incarnation of Lord Krishna) is an intelligent and naughty kid who stays at an orphanage school along with his friends - Pinky and Babloo.
An evil demon king, posing as principal Kanishk (incarnation of Kansa) is out to create havoc in the school. He has ulterior motives to take over the world with his army of zombie demons.
To save his friends and school from annihilation, Kris prays to Lord Vishnu and is blessed with superpowers. Armed with a magical peacock feather and a flute, Kris is ready to take on Kanishk. Kanishk with the help of his minions always tries to takedown Kris and often brings demons from Paataal Nagri to do so but always fails.

Characters

Main 
 Krish: Krish is a godly child mostly known as neele gobaare by Golu. He is an incarnation of Lord Krishna. He has appeared in Mathura Anath Ashram to stop Kanishk and his evil plans. Kris stays as a normal student in the school but secretly changes into Krishna, the divine boy with mystical powers whenever it is needed. He shows childish traits such as playing, disliking studies and homework, and enjoying playtime with his friends. He has a crush on Pinky. Like Lord Krishna, Kris also likes butter, ice cream. His skin color is blue in this series.
 Kanishk: Kanishk is the incarnation of Kansa who is the principal of Mathura Anath Ashram. He initially came back on earth to take over the world but Krishna's appearance is 'delaying' his whole plan. He is the king of demons of the Netherworld. In order to get rid of Kris, He keeps coming with a new "Get Kris" plan in each story which forms the storyline for the series. However, since defeating Kris is not easy, and he also has to manage the whole school and its duties, Kanishk keeps summoning various demons from the Netherworld to fight Kris. Kanishk is very concerned about the performance of his school and its result. He is seen constantly nagging with his staff to get the kids' performance up all the time.
  Dr. J: Dr. J is Kanishk's most loyal minion. He is a dentist and stays by Kanishk all the time. He is the reincarnation of Jarasandh. J often keeps coming with new ideas to get rid of Kris. Unfortunately, all his ideas backfire on him and Kanishk. Besides being a dentist, J is also a scientist who keeps inventing various machines, devices, and traps mostly used to tackle Kris. However, he often desires to be the principal of the school and hopes to kick Kanishk out because Kanishk keeps whacking and humiliating him. He gets help from Kris at times.
 Pinky: Pinky is Kris' classmate and a student of Mathura Anath Ashram. She is the incarnation of Radha. She is one of the best friends that Kris has and worries about Kris, her friends, and the school. She is an activist who keeps coming up with different initiatives for the betterment of the school and its students. She also has a crush on Kris. Pinky is also a brainiac who is good with studies.
 Babloo: Babloo is Kris' best friend and the reincarnation of Sudama. He stays with Kris most of the time and backs Kris and his ideas when confronted by Pinky. He is an average student but really good with sports.
 Madhu: Madhu is a friend of Kris and the brains of the group. Among all the friends Kris has, Madhu is the smartest one. He keeps coming up with many innovative ideas of gadgets and devices useful for kids. He is also the smartest student in the school. He often gets bullied by Golu. He is the reincarnation of Madhumangal.
 Golu: Golu is the bully of Mathura Anath Ashram. His only job and recreation are to mess with the kids and to take their stuff or food by force. He is often confronted by Kris and his friends. He is called motu (Fatso) by many people and kids as he has loved any kind of food. He is the overweighted student of the school. Many times, Golu is let in by Kanishk and J in their plans to get back at Kris. Golu happily participates in Kanishk's plans as he likes getting an opportunity to get even with Kris and Kanishk also manages to get Golu's grades a little high. He is the reincarnation of Subala.
 Sukhi: Sukhi is the reincarnation of Muni Narada in the school. He is in the school to report everything to the gods. He owns a phone booth outside the school, where he has a divine phone which connects straight to heaven. He reports about how Kris is doing through this booth. He knows Kris' secret and helps him often by letting him know of Kanishk's evil plans.

Recurring 
 Taarak: Taarak, an incarnation of Tarakasur, is Kanishk's cousin who is there in the school as a maths teacher. He is more of a 'Yes Sir' character who keeps nodding to all of Kanishk's plans to get back at Kris (no matter how ridiculous they are). He sometimes is shown wishing if Kanishk could let him be fit-free as he is constantly nagged by Kanishk to take more extra classes.
 Suparna: Suparna is the chemistry and music teacher of the school. She is the reincarnation of Putana. She is really fond of make-up and is a laid-back but strict teacher.
 Basu: Basu is the sports teacher of the Mathura Anath Ashram. He is loved by the kids and is their favorite teacher. He is the incarnation of Vasudeva and is the only human teacher, unlike the other teachers who are demons.
 Prashanth: He is a student in Mathura Anath Ashram. He is somewhat good in studies but very good at sports and dancing. He is the reincarnation of Ujavala.
 Ballu: He is the elder brother of Kris and the incarnation of Balarama. In his first scene in the show, he is seen keeping a public eye on Kris. He is also seen being over-protective of Kris.
 Chimpu and Champu: They are the two sidekicks of Golu. They think Golu is the best.
Guru Mahasur: He is teacher of all demons of Paataal-Nagri. He is the incarnation of Guru Shukracharya.
 Lord Aquarius: He is the overarching villain and is shown to be the strongest devil. He succeeds in beating Kris and Kanishk in the special episode "The Attack of the Shadow: Part I".
 Agent Veer: He is the protagonist of the show which is a favorite to Kris and his friends. He is a superhero and his enemy is Dr. Dhamakaa. He is supported by Kris and his friends.
 Dr. Dhamaka: He is the antagonist of the same show in which Agent Veer is the protagonist. He fights against Agent Veer and is supported by Kanishk and his minions. His two robotic assistants are Babloo and Dabloo.

Episodes

Season 1

Films 
This is the list of feature films of the show. They are also one of the first original Indian movies of Cartoon Network.

 Roll No 21 - The Quest for Swarnamani
 Roll No 21 - Space Mein Dhoom Dhadaka
 Roll No 21 - Time ki Bhool Bhulaiya
 Roll No 21 - Ticket to Australia
 Roll No 21 - Lights, Camera, Action Krish in Bollywood
 Roll No 21 - Krish aur Scuba Dooba Ajooba
 Roll No 21 - Get Set Go Krish
 Roll No 21 - Krish aur Phantom Ka Raaz
 Roll No 21 - Krish aur Shoonya Registaan
 Roll No 21 - Krish Vs Zombies
 Roll No 21 - Krish on Mission Hoola Boola
 Roll No 21 - Krish aur Ulta Pulta Time
 Roll No 21 - Krish aur Ande Ka Funda
 Roll No 21 -  Krish Chala jadui jimbura
 Roll No 21 - Krish aur Japani Jhanjaal
 Roll No 21 - Krish aur Barfeela Baffu
 Roll No 21 - Kris aur Aflatoon Africa

Special episodes 
 Roll no 21 Ticket to Japan
 Roll no 21 Ticket to Kajiranga
 Roll no 21 Ticket to China
 Roll no 21 Ticket to Kerala
 Roll no 21 vogeya to Aquatica
 Roll no 21 Merry Christmas
 Roll no 21 Krisbaba and 40 thieves
 Roll no 21 Kris vs Jatasur
 Roll no 21 Republic day (desh nerala)

Broadcast 
The series launched on Cartoon Network on 27 November 2010. It is the one of the first original shows which is produced for an Indian version of Cartoon Network. From February 21, 2021 the rerun of series and its movies aired on Pogo with the title Kris Roll no 21. On November 13, 2022 the series was started broadcasting by their new sister channel Discovery Kids (due to the merger of Warner Bros. and Discovery, Inc. as Warner Bros. Discovery) with the same title.

Awards 
Roll No 21 received three awards in the Cartoon Network Super Toons Award 2013 and 
Indian Telly Award for Best Kids Programme.

See also

 List of Indian animated television series

References

External links 
Minisite on Cartoon Network India

2010 Indian television series debuts
2010 Malaysian television series debuts
Indian children's animated action television series
Malaysian children's animated action television series
2010s animated television series
Cartoon Network (Indian TV channel) original programming
Krishna in popular culture
Television series based on Mahabharata
Animated television series about orphans